Masidwola (meaning "of the Mehsuds"), Mehsudi, or Maseedwola is a dialect of Waziristani.

Background
Waziristani is an east-central Pashto dialect spoken in South Waziristan, Southeastern parts of North Waziristan, parts of Bannu and Tank in Pakistan, and in certain adjacent districts of Paktika, Khost and Paktia provinces of Afghanistan.

The Masidwola dialect is almost identical to the dialect spoken around Urgun (eastern Paktika province) Wazirwola dialect and the Bannuchi dialect of Bannu, somewhat resembles the dialect spoken by Khattaks in Karak and has distant resemblance with Afridi dialect . The dialects of Loya Paktia like Zadrani are also very closely related, except that they are of the harsh northern variety.

Phonology
Masidwola differs significantly in pronunciation and grammar from the standard literary Pashto based on the larger Kandahar, Kabul and Yousafzai dialects. The vowels [a], [ɑ], [u] and [o] of standard Pashto yield [ɑ], [o], [i] and [e] respectively, so [paʂto] becomes [pɑʃte] in Masidwola.

Rozi Khan Burki claims that in Waziristani is that the phonemes [ʃ] and [ʂ], along with their voiced counterparts, [ʒ] and [ʐ], have merged into the phonemes [ɕ] and [ʑ],  both of which also exist in the nearby Ormuri or Warmuri language of Burkis of Kaniguram, South Waziristan. But Pashto linguists such as Josef Elfenbein, Anna Boyle or Yousaf Khan Jazab have not noted this in Waziri Phonology.

Lexicon
The standard Pashto word for "boy", "هلک" [halək], is rarely heard in Masidwola. Instead, "وړکای" [wuɽkai] meaning "little one" is used.

The word "ləshki" [ləʃki] is used instead of the standard "لږ" [ləʐ], "a little bit".

The pronoun موږ ([muʐ] or [mung]), meaning "we", is pronounced [miʒ] in Masidwola.

Orthography
Masidwola, like many other obscure Pashto dialects, is almost never written, and its speakers may use standard Pashto as a literary language. Masidwola Pashto is spoken by various tribes, by the Burki and Dawarwola by the Dawari. There are slight differences in pronunciation, for example, the phonemes [t͡s] and [d͡z] can become [s] and [z], or even [t͡ʃ] and [d͡ʒ], depending on the tribe or area the speaker is from.

See also
Waneci

Notes
Linguist List
Lorimer, John Gordon (1902). Grammar and Vocabulary of Waziri Pashto.

References

Pashto dialects
Languages of Afghanistan
Languages of Khyber Pakhtunkhwa
Waziristan